The 2015 Varsity Shield was contested from 2 February to 6 April 2015. The tournament (also known as the FNB Varsity Shield presented by Steinhoff International for sponsorship reasons) was the fifth season of the Varsity Shield, an annual second-tier inter-university rugby union competition featuring five South African universities.

No team was promoted to the top-tier Varsity Cup competition for 2016.

Competition rules and information

There were five participating universities in the 2015 Varsity Shield. These teams played each other twice over the course of the season, once at home and once away.

Teams received four points for a win and two points for a draw. Bonus points were awarded to teams that scored four or more tries in a game, as well as to teams that lost a match by seven points or less. Teams were ranked by log points, then points difference (points scored less points conceded).

The top two teams qualified for the title play-offs. The team that finished first had home advantage against the team that finished second.

There was no promotion/relegation between the Varsity Cup and the Varsity Shield at the end of 2015.

The 2015 Varsity Shield used a different scoring system than the common scoring system. Tries were worth five points as usual, but conversions were worth three points instead of two, while penalties and drop goals were only worth two points instead of three.

Teams

The following teams took part in the 2015 Varsity Shield competition:

Standings

The final league standings for the 2015 Varsity Shield were:

Round-by-round

The table below shows each team's progression throughout the season. For each round, their cumulative points total is shown with the overall log position in brackets:

Fixtures

The 2015 Varsity Shield fixtures were released as follows:

 All times are South African (GMT+2).

Round one

This meant that  moved into topped the log after Round One.

Round two

Wits moved into second place on the log while UFH dropped down to third after suffering their first defeat of the season.  had a bye this round and remained in fourth spot on the log.

Round three

Braces from Constant Beckerling and Tommy Damba helped  emerge victorious from the top-two clash against , with a comprehensive 56–13 win – their second away win in a row – to move them to the top of the log and with a game in hand over UKZN.  moved up to third on the log by beating bottom side  21–18 in Pretoria, with a two-try haul from Damian Stevens proving decisive. UWC leap-frogged , who dropped to fourth spot after a bye in Round Three.

Round four

They ran in ten tries, with Tommy Damba, Ferdinand Kelly and Luxolo Ntsepe getting a brace each, while fly-half Brandan Hewitt scored one of their tries and slotted seven conversions. Both of the losing sides, UFH Blues and TUT Vikings, picked up a bonus point for scoring five tries in their matches, but remained in fourth and fifth respectively.

Round five

League leaders  dropped their first points of the season after they were held to a 37–all draw by third-placed  in Johannesburg. Wits were leading 37–16 after 55 minutes, but UWC responded with three more tries late in the game to level things up, with winger James Verity-Amm scoring a second consecutive hat-trick after also getting one in Round Four against .  took advantage of their main rivals drawing to secure a 21–13 victory over UFH, which saw them remain in second, but closed the gap to league leaders Wits to five points.

Round six

Their log positions remained unchanged, however, with UFH Blues still in fourth and TUT Vikings in last place with two log points.

Round seven

Luxolo Ntsepe scored a hat-trick, while Constant Beckerling and Josh Jarvis got two tries apiece and fly-half Brandan Hewitt scored one try and nine conversions for a personal points tally of 32 points. Marius Louw grabbed a hat-trick in their victory and Spa Dube contributed 21 points with the boot.  remained in third place in the league with their bye, while TUT's four-try bonus point wasn't enough to move them ahead of fourth-placed UFH Blues.

Round eight

Hosts  emerged victorious in the match between the top two teams in the league, beating  40–26 to extend their lead at the top of the log to four points. Both teams picked up a four-try bonus point in the match that was only settled with a last-minute Tommy Damba try. This result also meant that Wits secured their place in the final of the competition.  kept up their attempt to clinch the other spot in the final by beating  63–10 in Cape Town. They ran in nine tries, with Quaid Langeveldt, James Verity-Amm and Gordon-Wayne Plaatjes getting a brace each. This result saw them close the gap to second-placed UKZN to six points, with a game in hand. A bye round for  saw them remain in fourth spot, well clear of bottom side TUT Vikings.

Round nine

With their sixth win of the season,  ensured that they would finish the regular season top of the log, which meant that the final would be played in Johannesburg. The identity of their opposition in the final was still unknown, since second-placed  had a bye, which saw  reduce the gap to just one point. That result also ensured that UFH Blues would finish the season in fourth spot with TUT Vikings guaranteed to finish bottom of the log.

Round ten

The final line-up was completed as  joined already-qualified  in the final. A hat-trick from centre Marius Louw secured a 42–0 victory for UKZN over fourth-placed  in Durban to ensure the side finished second on the log. Meanwhile, log leaders  and third-placed  played out their second draw of the season, with their match finishing 21–all in Cape Town after drawing 37–all in their Round Five match in Johannesburg.  had a bye round and finished bottom of the log.

Final

UKZN Impi took the lead fifteen minute in through captain Lwazi Ngcungama and didn't relinquish it for the remainder of the match. Fly-half Inny Radebe was the top scorer in the match with eleven points.

Honours

The honour roll for the 2015 Varsity Shield was as follows:

Players

Player statistics

The following table contain points which were scored in the 2015 Varsity Shield:

Squad lists

The teams released the following squad lists:

Forwards

 Jeremia Burger
 Shaun de Wet
 Neil de Witt
 James Frost
 Hamish Herd
 Claude Johannes
 Wessel Jordaan
 Attie Joubert
 Jean-Claude le Roux
 Calvin Maduna
 Armand Marshall
 Percy Matlhoko
 Mandla Mdaka
 Ross Middlecote
 Ratsaka Modjadji
 DK Mukendi
 Daniel Richter
 Jaco van Staden
 Wian van Schalkwyk
 Did not play:
 Isak Deetlefs
 Mpho Kganakga
 Dimpho Matshediso
 Bethuel Mosetekoa
 Lindokuhle Sambo
 Ryan Sim
Backs

 Lisa Banzi
 Dylan du Buisson
 Shawn Jaards
 Deon Joubert
 Thabang Kibe
 Tovhowani Nefale
 Octavian Nkomonde
 Edwin Oliver
 Ruan Pienaar
 Vian Riekert
 Nelis Snyman
 RW van der Wal
 Lewies van Deventer
 Litha Vumisa
 Paul Walters
 Did not play:
 Leroy Afrika
 Thomas Joubert
 Ndivho Nematandani
 Dwayne Swart
 Dries van der Westhuizen
Coach

 Sax Chirwa

Forwards

 Lutho Klaas
 Madoda Ludidi
 Lwando Mabenge
 Athenkosi Makeleni
 Athenkosi Manentsa
 Ntyatyambo Mkhafu
 Olwethu Mputla
 Lusindiso Nkomo
 Lwando Nteta
 Siphesihle Punguzwa
 Zanoxolo Qwele
 Sibusiso Sityebi
 Sesethu Time
 Mzinga Vitsha
 Malusi Vula
 Did not play:
 Darren Alexander
 Asiphe Fanele
 Busiwe Fani
 Litha Labase
 Andile Makinana
 Philisani Khangelani Ncoko
 Siphelele Njobeni
 Likhona Nkqoli
 Ntsika Nyalambisa
 Misubukhosi Pienaar
 Siyabulela Sijula
Backs

 Siviwe Bisset
 Sanelise Getye
 Khanyiso Komani
 Ntsika Kula
 Aziyena Mandaba
 Akhona Matutu
 Lithabile Mgwadleka
 Hlubi Mvana
 Sthembiso Ngwenya
 Lundi Ralarala
 Elandre Sias
 Khaya Siqoko
 Sivakele Ulana
 Did not play:
 Luyolo Batshise
 Benson Chiripanhura
 Asiphe Fihla
 Yanga Nakani
 Sibusiso Sinuka
Coach

 Elliott Fana

Forwards

 Marné Coetzee
 Chris de Beer
 Johan du Toit
 David Harel
 Michael Hutton
 Sizwe Kubheka
 Sanele Malwane
 Matthew Mandioma
 Siya Mhlongo
 Njabulo Mkize
 Ntando Mpofana
 Lwazi Ngcungama
 William Paxton
 Kwezi Puza
 Christie van der Merwe
 Mikyle Webster
 Ado Wessels
 Did not play:
 Henri Boshoff
 Mees Erasmus
 Sikhumbuzo Rowen Gasa
 Mzamo Majola
 Emilien Mary
 Milani Lutho Motlohi
 Clive Musasiwa
 Lindo Radebe
 Nduduzo Thembelenkosini Sithole
 Ayathandwa Tsengiwe
Backs

 Thobekani Buthelezi
 Marcel Coetzee
 Spa Dube
 Rowan Gouws
 Graham Koch
 Rico Lategan
 Marius Louw
 Shayne Makombe
 Philip Marais
 Yandisa Mdolomba
 Gavin Nyawata
 Inny Radebe
 Langelihle Shange
 Alwayno Visagie
 Sandile Zulu
 Did not play:
 Jurie Johannes Ingram
 Manqoba Mqudi
 Miguel Thabo Ncube
 Michael Scheepers
 Bongumusa Tshabalala
Coach

 Ryan Strudwick

Forwards

 Tahriq Allan
 Stuart Austin
 Curtis Beukes
 Brandon Beukman
 Alwyn Carstens
 Kelvin de Bruyn
 Matthew Faught
 Lifa Ghana
 José Julies
 Heynes Kotze
 Mitch Lingeveldt
 Wayrin Losper
 Darren Luiters
 Sebenza Maphumulo
 Chadwin Robertson
 Brandon Valentyn
 Did not play:
 Axolile Apleni
 Mische Kamlesh Vallabh
Backs

 Gavian Cloete
 Clayton Daniels
 Lubabalo Faleni
 Dean Herbert
 Gustav Heydenrych
 Darian Hock
 Keanu Langeveldt
 Quaid Langeveldt
 Minenhle Mthethwa
 Matthew Nortjé
 Shane Pietersen
 Gordon-Wayne Plaatjes
 Yaasien Railoun
 Herman Share
 Damian Stevens
 Octaven van Stade
 James Verity-Amm
 Did not play:
 Stephan Borman
 Chad Christopher de Klerk
 Blake Andre Reineke
 Wilbré van Wyk
 Melik Wana
Coach

 Peter de Villiers

Forwards

 Ben Baggott
 Constant Beckerling
 Richard Crossman
 Jethi de Lange
 Angus Gordon
 Rhyno Herbst
 Ferdinand Kelly
 Graham Logan
 Ayabulela Mdudi
 Chris Mills
 Brandon Palmer
 Luvuyo Pupuma
 Cameron Shafto
 Tijde Visser
 Ameer Williams
 Did not play:
 Wazeer Desai
 Mitchell Fraser
 Gihard Visagie
Backs

 Alistair Ballantyne
 Tommy Damba
 Sicelo Champion
 Ruan Cloete
 Brandan Hewitt
 Josh Jarvis
 Koch Marx
 Sibusiso Mngomezulu
 Ish Nkolo
 Luxolo Ntsepe
 AJ van Blerk
 Dandré van den Berg
 Ruan van Rensburg
 Did not play:
 Joel Bwanakawa
 Kyle Wesemann
Coach

 Hugo van As

Discipline

The following table contains all the cards handed out during the tournament:

Referees

The following referees officiated matches in the 2015 Varsity Shield:
 Stephan Geldenhuys
 Quinton Immelman
 AJ Jacobs
 Cwengile Jadezweni
 Jaco Kotze
 Vusi Msibi
 Sindile Ngcese
 Tahla Ntshakaza
 Francois Pretorius
 Fernando Uithaler
 Ricus van der Hoven
 Renier Vermeulen
 Kurt Weaver

See also

 Varsity Cup
 2015 Varsity Rugby
 2015 Varsity Cup
 2015 SARU Community Cup
 2015 Vodacom Cup

References

External links
 
 

2015
2015 in South African rugby union
2015 rugby union tournaments for clubs